Santo Amaro is a civil parish on the northern coast of the island of Pico, in the eastern part of the municipality of São Roque do Pico in the Azores, Portugal. It has 255 inhabitants in an area of 11.86 km². It is the least populated parish in the municipality. It contains the localities Debaixo da Rocha, Ponta de João Salino, Portinho, Santo Amaro and Terra Alta.

References

Freguesias of São Roque do Pico